Veyrat is a surname. Notable people with the surname include:

Jacques Veyrat (born 1962), French businessman
Marc Veyrat (born 1950), French chef
Xavier Veyrat (1807–1876), French playwright

Surnames of French origin